The Otter Creek Archaeological Site may refer to the following sites:

Otter Creek Archaeological Site (Ferrum, Virginia), listed on the National Register of Historic Places
Otter Creek Archaeological Site (Keota, Oklahoma), listed on the National Register of Historic Places